The following is a list of Brazilian films released in 2017.

January – March

April – June

See also
 2017 in Brazil

References

External links
tv_series&year=2017,2017 Feature Films Released In 2017 With Country of Origin Brazil at IMDb

2017

Brazil